In enzymology, an ADP-specific glucokinase also known as  ADP-dependent glucokinase is an enzyme that catalyzes the chemical reaction

ADP + D-glucose  AMP + D-glucose 6-phosphate

Thus, the two substrates of this enzyme are ADP and D-glucose, whereas its two products are AMP and D-glucose 6-phosphate.

This enzyme belongs to the family of transferases, to be specific those transferring phosphorus-containing groups (phosphotransferases) with an alcohol group as acceptor.

In humans, the ADP-dependent glucokinase is encoded by the ADPGK gene.

Structural studies

As of late 2007, only one structure has been solved for this class of enzymes, with the PDB accession code .

References

External links

Further reading 

 
 
 
 
 
 

EC 2.7.1
Enzymes of known structure